Inkaneep is an unincorporated community located on the east side of the Okanagan River within Osoyoos Indian Reserve No. 1, between the towns of Oliver and Osoyoos, British Columbia, Canada, in that province's South Okanagan region.

Name
The name is an older anglicization of Nk'mip, the Okanagan language for "at the head of the lake" or "creek which loses itself in the lake"., which the band uses for its Nk'mip Winery and associated museum and desert centre.

See also
Inkaneep Provincial Park
List of communities in British Columbia

References

Populated places in the South Okanagan
Unincorporated settlements in British Columbia
Populated places in the Okanagan Country